Daryl Lane Caudle (born 1963) is a United States Navy  admiral who is the 35th commander of United States Fleet Forces Command since December 7, 2021. He most recently served as commander of Naval Submarine Forces (COMSUBFOR), Commander, Submarine Force Atlantic (COMSUBLANT) and Commander, Allied Submarine Command (ASC). As COMSUBFOR, he was the undersea domain lead, and is responsible for the submarine force's strategic vision. As COMSUBLANT, he commanded all Atlantic-based U.S. submarines, their crews and supporting shore activities. These responsibilities also include duties as commander, Task Force (CTF) 114, CTF 88, and CTF 46.  As commander, Allied Submarine Command, he was the principal undersea warfare advisor to all North Atlantic Treaty Organization (NATO) strategic commanders.

Prior to this assignment, he was Vice Director for Strategy, Plans, and Policy on the Joint Staff (J-5) in Washington, D.C.

Early life and education
Caudle was born in Winston-Salem, North Carolina. He graduated magna cum laude with a Bachelor of Science in chemical engineering from North Carolina State University in 1985. He was commissioned in the Navy after completing his training from Officer Candidate School. He holds advanced academic degrees from the Naval Postgraduate School where he graduated with distinction with a Master of Science in Physics in 1992 and from Old Dominion University with a Master of Science in engineering management. He also graduated from the School of Advanced Studies, a branch of University of Phoenix, where he obtained his doctor of management in organizational leadership with a specialization in information systems and technology.

Caudle's published dissertation focused on military decision-making uncertainty while considering the use of force in cyberspace. He is also a professional engineer.

On December 4, 2020, the Department of Chemical and Biomolecular Engineering (CBE) at North Carolina State University awarded him the CBE Distinguished Alumni Award.

Naval career

Caudle served at various posts during his sea tour assignments such as division officer, USS George Washington Carver (SSBN-656), engineer of USS Stonewall Jackson (SSBN-634) and USS Sand Lance (SSN-660) as well as serving as executive officer of USS Montpelier (SSN-765). His first command assignment was as commanding officer of USS Jefferson City (SSN-759). While appointed to the Submarine Squadron 11 as deputy commander, he served as commanding officer of USS Topeka (SSN-754) and USS Helena (SSN-725).  He also commanded Submarine Squadron 3 as Commodore.

Caudle's tours ashore include assignments as assistant force nuclear power officer, commander Submarine Force, U.S. Atlantic Fleet; Officer-in-Charge of Moored Training Ship (MTS 635); deputy commander of Submarine Squadron 11; assistant deputy director for information and cyberspace policy on the Joint Staff (J-5) in Washington, D.C.; and chief of staff, commander Submarine Force, U.S. Pacific Fleet.

Caudle's other flag assignments include deputy chief for security cooperation, Office of the Defense Representative, Pakistan where he directly supported coalition forces for Operation Enduring Freedom; deputy commander, Joint Functional Component Command-Global Strike; deputy commander, U.S. 6th Fleet; director of operations U.S. Naval Forces Europe-Africa; commander, Submarine Group Eight, where he directed combat strikes using the first ever dual Carrier operations with allies in support of Operation Inherent Resolve. He also designed the plan and directed combat sorties for Operation Odyssey Lightning to counter violent extremists in Libya; and commander, Submarine Force, U.S. Pacific Fleet.

In July 2021, he was nominated and confirmed for promotion to four-star admiral to succeed Christopher W. Grady as commander of the United States Fleet Forces Command.

Awards and decorations

Personal life
Caudle is married to Donna Caudle, with whom they have two daughters, two stepdaughters, one grandson, and one granddaughter. Two of his sons-in-law are active duty military, one in the Navy and one in the Marine Corps. He lives in Norfolk, Virginia.

References

1963 births
Date of birth missing (living people)
Living people
People from Winston-Salem, North Carolina
North Carolina State University alumni
Military personnel from North Carolina
Naval Postgraduate School alumni
Old Dominion University alumni
United States submarine commanders
Recipients of the Meritorious Service Medal (United States)
University of Phoenix alumni
United States Navy vice admirals
Recipients of the Defense Superior Service Medal